The Central District of Dehgolan County is a district (bakhsh) in Dehgolan County, Kurdistan Province, Iran. At the 2006 census, its population was 41,647, in 9,799 families.  The District has one city: Dehgolan. The District has three rural districts (dehestan): Howmeh-ye Dehgolan Rural District, Quri Chay Rural District, and Yeylaq-e Shomali Rural District.

References 

Dehgolan County
Districts of Kurdistan Province